The imperial election of 1711 was an imperial election held to select the emperor of the Holy Roman Empire.  It took place on October 12.

Background 
On December 17, 1692, Leopold I, Holy Roman Emperor created the Electorate of Brunswick-Lüneburg and the Lutheran Ernest Augustus, Elector of Brunswick-Lüneburg, prince of Calenberg, duke of Brunswick-Lüneburg and prince-bishop of Osnabrück its prince-elector.  The Imperial Diet did not immediately ratify his choice.  Ernest Augustus would die on January 23, 1698 and be succeeded by his son who later became George I of Great Britain.

In 1697, Augustus II the Strong, elector of Saxony, converted from Lutheranism to Catholicism as a prerequisite in his campaign to be elected king of the Polish–Lithuanian Commonwealth.  However, Lutheranism remained the state church of Saxony.

War of the Spanish Succession 

On October 3, 1700, weeks before his death, the childless and severely disabled Charles II of Spain named the French prince Philippe, Duke of Anjou, his sister's grandson and the grandson of King Louis XIV of France, heir to the entire Spanish Empire.  The possession by the House of Bourbon of the French and Spanish thrones threatened the balance of power in Europe.  England, Austria and the Dutch Republic, fearing this threat, resurrected the Grand Alliance in support of the claim of Charles VI, Holy Roman Emperor, then a young man of fifteen.  Leopold had married another sister of Charles II in 1666, and in 1685 their daughter surrendered her right to the Spanish throne to Charles VI, Leopold's son from a later marriage.  The first hostilities of the War of the Spanish Succession broke out in June 1701.  The Grand Alliance declared war on France in May 1702.

That same year, Maximilian II Emanuel, Elector of Bavaria, and his brother Joseph Clemens of Bavaria, the elector of Cologne, joined France in support of Philip's claim to the Spanish succession.  They were quickly forced into flight and were deprived of their electorates by the Imperial Diet in 1706.

In 1708, to compensate for the absence of the electors of Bavaria and Cologne, the Imperial Diet ratified the admission of Brunswick-Lüneburg to the Electoral College and called for the king of Bohemia to join the proceedings, from which he and his predecessors had abstained in the elections of 1653, 1658 and 1690.

Election of 1711 

Joseph I, Holy Roman Emperor died of smallpox on April 17, 1711.  The prince-electors called to elect his successor were:

 Lothar Franz von Schönborn, elector of Mainz
 Charles Joseph of Lorraine, elector of Trier
 Charles VI, Holy Roman Emperor, king of Bohemia
 Johann Wilhelm, Elector Palatine, elector of the Electoral Palatinate
 Augustus II the Strong, elector of Saxony
 Frederick I of Prussia, elector of Brandenburg
 George, elector of Brunswick-Lüneburg, later King George I of Great Britain

Of these, the electors of Brandenburg and Brunswick-Lüneburg were the sole Protestants.

Elected 
Charles VI was elected Holy Roman Emperor.  He was crowned in Frankfurt on December 22.

1711
1711 in the Holy Roman Empire
Non-partisan elections
Charles VI, Holy Roman Emperor
18th-century elections in Europe
Frederick I of Prussia